The 2018 Brussels Cycling Classic was the 98th edition of the Brussels Cycling Classic road cycling one day race. It was held on 1 September 2018 as part of the 2018 UCI Europe Tour as a 1.HC event.

Teams
Twenty-four teams participated in the race, of which eight were UCI WorldTour teams, fifteen were UCI Professional Continental teams, and one was a UCI Continental Team. Of these riders, 129 riders finished and 36 did not.

UCI WorldTeams

 
 
 
 
 
 
 
 

UCI Professional Continental Teams

 
 
 
 
 
 
 
 
 
 
 
 
 
 
 

UCI Continental Teams

Results

References

External links

2018 Brussels Cycling Classic
Brussels Cycling Classic
Brussels Cycling Classic
Brussels Cycling Classic